NGC 6540 is a globular cluster in the constellation Sagittarius. Its apparent magnitude is 9.3 and its diameter is about 9.5 arcminutes, with 12 faint stars visible. It is about 17,000 light years away from Earth and was discovered by Wilhelm Herschel on May 24, 1784 with an 18.7-inch mirror telescope, who described the cluster as "pretty faint, not large, crookedly extended, easily resolvable".

References
 	
 Robert Burnham, Jr, Burnham's Celestial Handbook: An observer's guide to the universe beyond the solar system, vol 3, p.1556

External links
 NGC 6540

Globular clusters
Sagittarius (constellation)
6540